Jerome Alexander Dahlke (June 8, 1929 – September 2, 2006) was a pitcher in Major League Baseball. He played for the Chicago White Sox in 1956.

Overview
Jerry Dahlke made his debut on May 6, 1956. He had an ERA of 19.29.

References

External links

, or Retrosheet

<rf>

1929 births
2006 deaths
Baseball players from Wisconsin
Chattanooga Lookouts players
Chicago White Sox players
Colorado Springs Sky Sox players
Indianapolis Indians players
Louisville Colonels (minor league) players
Major League Baseball pitchers
Memphis Chickasaws players
Muskegon Clippers players
People from Batesville, Mississippi
People from Marathon, Wisconsin
Rapiños de Occidente players
Wisconsin Rapids White Sox players